Singapore has been participating at the Deaflympics since 2001. 

Singapore has competed at the Summer Deaflympics on three occasions in 2001, 2005, 2009 and 2013.

Medal tallies

Summer Deaflympics

See also 
 Singapore at the Olympics
 Singapore at the Paralympics

References 

 Singapore at the Deaflympics 

Nations at the Deaflympics